Laborde, or LaBorde, is a surname. Notable persons with that name include:

 Jean-Joseph de Laborde (1724–1794), French politician
 Alexandre de Laborde (1773–1842), French antiquary, liberal politician and writer
 Jean Laborde (1805–1878), French consul to Madagascar
 Jean Laborde, (1922–2022), French politician
 Léon de Laborde (1807-1869), French archaeologist and traveler
 Jean de Laborde (1878–1977), French Vichyste admiral
 Henri LaBorde (1909–1993), American athlete
 Mae Laborde (1909–2012), American actress
 Adras LaBorde (1912–1993), American reporter
 Raymond Laborde (1927–2016), Louisiana politician
 Genie Z. Laborde (born 1928), American woman writer
 Henri de Laborde de Monpezat (1934-2018), husband of Margrethe II, Queen of Denmark
 Santiago Oñate Laborde (born 1949), Mexican lawyer
 Françoise Laborde (born 1958), French politician
 Leopoldo Laborde (born 1970), Mexican film director
 Yurisel Laborde (born 1979), Cuban judoka
 Ricardo Laborde (born 1988), Colombian football (soccer) player
 Thierry Laborde, French chef

See also
 
 

Occitan-language surnames